Alexander Tóth (born 4 August 2001) is a professional Slovak footballer who plays as a midfielder for Slovan Bratislava B.

Club career

ŠKF Sereď
Tóth made his Fortuna Liga debut for Sereď against his former employer, Slovan Bratislava on 28 February 2021 in ViOn Aréna. Tóth came in as a second-half replacement for Denis Potoma, who too played in Slovan, after 84 minutes of play, with the score at 0:4 for Belasí. During his tenure on the pitch Erik Daniel scored the match's final goal sealing the 0:5 win for the reigning champions.

References

External links
 
 Futbalnet profile

2001 births
Living people
Place of birth missing (living people)
Slovak footballers
Slovakia youth international footballers
Association football midfielders
ŠK Slovan Bratislava players
ŠKF Sereď players
2. Liga (Slovakia) players
Slovak Super Liga players